Canal+ (current Forever Group in Myanmar and Canal+ Group in France. Originally launched by Forever Group alone, Canal+ Group joined in the business in 2017, and the service adopted the current name in April 2021.

Canal+ delivers the service through the digital terrestrial television (DTT) signals (available in Yangon and Mandalay) and direct-to-home (DTH) satellite television signals (beamed through Thaicom 6). It launched a Burmese version of My Canal OTT television service in 2019.

There are 80 television channels, including nine in-house television channels, available on the platform. After 2021 February, some of the international broadcasting channels were closed including news channel like CNN, BBC during the 2021 Myanmar coup d'état. As 2022 October 1, the total number of channels are now 69.

In-house channels
Canal+ Kyi Lite : a TV Guide Channel.
 Canal+ Gita: a music channel.
 Canal+ Action: an action film channel.
 Canal+ Pu Tu Tue: a channel targeting preschoolers.
 Canal+ Sports 1: a sports channel.
 Canal+ Sports 2: a sports channel.
 Canal+ Cha Tate: a channel targeting children and teenagers.
 Canal+ Mae Madi: a drama channel aimed at female audiences.
 Canal+ Zat Lenn: a film channel.
 Canal+ Su Sann: a documentary channel.

TV series broadcast on Canal+ Zat Lenn
 Toxic season 1 (2018)
 Myanmar The Incredible Journeys season 1
(2018)
 Traveller's Note season 1 (2018)
 Traveller's Note season 2 (2018)
 New Page season 1
(2018)
 Traveller's Note season 3 (2019)
 Traveller's Note season 4 (2019)
 Traveller's Note season 5 (2019)
 Traveller's Note season 6 (2019)
 Traveller's Note season 7 (2019)
 Traveller's Note season 8 (2019)
 Toxic season 2 (2019)
 New Page season 2 (2019)
 Spirit of Fight season 1 (2019)
 Mingalar Village season 1 (2019)
 Lake Pyar season 1 (2019)
 Mingalar Village season 2 (2020)
 Spirit of Fight season 2 (2020)
 Mingalar Village season 3 (2020)
 Lake Pyar season 2 (2021)
 Mission Chefs (2022)
 Colourful Dreams (2022)
 Trapped (2022)
 Brew Me a Favor (2022)
 Crying Forest (2022)
 An Ugly & Seven Handsomes'' (2023)

References

External links
 

Mass media in Myanmar
Television channels in Myanmar
Direct broadcast satellite services
Mass media in Yangon
Myanmar